Shirl Bernheim (September 21, 1921 in Manhattan, New York City – March 30, 2009 in Englewood, New Jersey) was an American actress of film and television.

She was born as Shirley Raphael and made her sole appearance on Broadway in her debut in 2000, aged 79, in The Tale of the Allergist's Wife, in which she played "Frieda", the mother of the lead character (played by Linda Lavin and Valerie Harper, consecutively). Bernheim appeared in the play from October 12, 2000, until May 26, 2002.

Starting late in the industry, using her married name as her professional name, Bernheim's film and television career began in 1978 and lasted until 2004, with her second appearance on Law & Order. From 1978 to 1979 she played "Polly the Prize Lady" on The Cheap Show, which was hosted by Dick Martin.

Filmography

References

External links
Official website 

Film Reference biodata

1921 births
2009 deaths
Actresses from New York City
American film actresses
American television actresses
People from Englewood, New Jersey
20th-century American actresses
21st-century American women